The Men's 100 metres B2 was a track event in athletics at the 1992 Summer Paralympics, for visually impaired athletes. It consisted of five heats, two semi-finals and a final.

Results

First round

Heat 1

Heat 2

Heat 3

Heat 4

Heat 5

Semi-final

Heat 1

Heat 2

Final

References 

Men's 100 metres B2